Adolf Potočar (born 18 August 1932) is a Croatian rower. He competed in the men's coxed four event at the 1960 Summer Olympics.

References

External links
 

1932 births
Living people
Croatian male rowers
Olympic rowers of Yugoslavia
Rowers at the 1960 Summer Olympics
Sportspeople from Ljubljana